The calung is a type of Indonesian bamboo xylophone originating from Baduy culture and commonly used in Baduy, Bantenese, Sundanese, Banyumasan, and Balinese performances. The calung (instrument) consists of multiple bamboo tubes which are struck at the base to produce a woody sound.

In the Balinese Gamelan gong kebyar, the metallophone Jublag can also be known as Calung, it has a one-octave range, and is generally utilized to play mid-range melodies.

In Banyumas, southwestern Central Java in Indonesia, when Calung is referred to as an ensemble, it uses multiple bamboo instruments and is composed of singers and dancers. The ensemble is characterized by a variety of traits that include: interlocking melodies and rhythm, abrupt changes in tempo, as well as syncopated rhythm and humorous vocals. Calung (the ensemble) is present at many celebratory gatherings, and its dancers are sometimes related to prostitution.

In 2011, calung traditions are recognized as National Intangible Cultural Heritage of Indonesia by the Indonesian Ministry of Education and Culture.

Etymology
The word "calung" unilaterally claimed by the people of Banyumas comes from the Javanese language. The word comes from two words that are combined into one, namely "carang pring wulung" or the shoot of wulung bamboo/black bamboo (Gigantochloa atroviolacea).

Instrument
The calung works by cutting away multiple pieces of bamboo tubes to create a pitch when struck. To make the Calung in the Sundanese tradition, a set of bamboo tubes are strung together through holes cut into the tubes. You are then able to play the Calung either suspended; you play the tubes while they are in hanging in front of you, or you can put them across a bamboo frame and play it like a xylophone.

Gallery

See also

 Gamelan
 Music of Sunda
 Music of Java
 Music of Bali

References

External links
(August 2, 2011). "Calung Traditional Art from West java", Antique-Teak-Furniture.BlogSpot.com. An example of a Calung ensemble can be found in the video halfway down the page.

Indonesian musical instruments
Gamelan instruments
Keyboard percussion instruments
Music of West Java
Sundanese culture